William Nock may refer to:
 William Nock (footballer)
 William Nock (cricketer)